The Mamainse Point Formation is a geologic formation in Algoma District in Northeastern Ontario, Canada. Marie along Lake Superior. The rocks comprising the Mamainse Point Formation are volcanic in origin, having been deposited by volcanism of the Midcontinent Rift System.

See also
Volcanism of Canada
Volcanism of Eastern Canada

References

Volcanism of Ontario
Geologic formations of Ontario
Mesoproterozoic volcanism